|}

The Klairon Davis Novice Chase is a Grade 3 National Hunt novice steeplechase in Ireland which is open to horses aged four years or older. It is run at Navan over a distance of 2 miles and 1 furlong (3,419 metres) and during its running there are 12 fences to be jumped. The race is scheduled to take place each year in December. 

The race was first run in 2015.  It is named in honour of Klairon Davis, winner of the Queen Mother Champion Chase in 1996.

Records
Leading jockey :
 no jockey has won this race more than once

Leading trainer  (4 wins):
 Gordon Elliott- Tombstone (2017), Hardline (2018), Andy Dufresne (2020), Riviere D'etel (2021)

Winners

See also
 Horse racing in Ireland
 List of Irish National Hunt races

References

Racing Post:

National Hunt chases
National Hunt races in Ireland
Navan Racecourse
Recurring sporting events established in 2015
2015 establishments in Ireland